The Houston Center for Contemporary Craft is a non-profit arts organization that offers exhibitions, educational programming, and an artist-in-residence program from their building in the Houston Museum District. The center was founded in September 2001 with the goal of furthering education and public awareness of contemporary craft pieces, or artworks made from materials like wood, glass, fiber, metal, and recycled materials.

HCCC is funded by grants from many organizations, including the Houston Art Alliance, the National Endowment For The Arts, Houston Endowment, Inc., the Texas Commission on The Arts, The Brown Foundation, the Kinder Foundation, and private donations. The center is free to the public and open most days of the week. As of 2017, HCCC saw an average of nearly 13,000 visitors and hosted 5-10 resident artists annually.

Exhibitions 
The center's exhibition spaces include the Main Gallery and the Front Gallery, each of which host several revolving exhibitions a year, and the Artist's Hall, where current resident artists can work and share their pieces. The Asher Gallery serves as an in-house sales space for local artists, makers, and creative vendors, and it regularly hosts special events and pop-up shops.

The HCCC has hosted dozens of group and solo shows, all centering contemporary craft and crafters. In addition to an annual resident artist exhibition, notable exhibitions have included:

 Judy Jensen: Feverish, 2002
 Gijs Bakker: Selected Retrospective, 2002
 Poetics of Clay: An International Perspective, 2003
 Metaphor & Magnitude: Kendall Buster & Donald Fortescue, 2005
 Kickin' it with Joyce J. Scott, 2007
 Richard Black: The Art of Cue, 2007
 Warren Mackenzie: Legacy of an American Potter, 2008
 Craft in America - Expanding Traditions, 2008
 Texas Master Series: Rachelle Thiewes, 2009
 Lisa Gralnick: The Gold Standard, 2011
 Arline Fisch: Creatures From The Deep, 2011
 Beyond Useful & Beautiful: Rethinking Domestic Craft, 2011
 Bridge 11: Lia Cook, 2012
 Transference: Andy Paiko & Ethan Rose, 2012
 Dark Light: The Micaceous Ceramics of Christine Nofchissey Mchorse, 2014
 Course of Action: 50 Years of Jewelry and Enamel at the Glassell School of Art, 2015
 Wendy Maruyama: The WildLIFE Project, 2015
 Found Objects: Works by Sondra Sherman, 2016
 Future Traditions: Melissa Cody, 2017
 Annie Evelyn: Multiple Impressions, 2017
 Justin Favela: All You Can Eat, 2019
 Weave Houston: Celebrating 71 Years of The Contemporary Handweavers of Houston, 2021
 Texas Master Series: James C. Watkins, 2021

Craft garden 
The Craft Garden is a joint venture between artists, gardeners, and other Houston community members to maintain an outdoor educational exhibition space that is unique to HCCC. Rather than focusing on flowering or edible plants, The Craft Garden features four separate spaces dedicated to the plants used to make baskets, textiles, dyes, and papers. A small selection of plants in the garden include: turmeric, madder, and indigo used primarily for dyes, and brown cotton and ramie, used largely for basket-making, weaving, paper-making, and other fiber arts. The center often hosts educational workshops in the garden, and resident artists are invited to harvest materials for their practices directly from the ground, to be inspired by the natural environment it offers, and to install exhibits outdoors.

In addition to the plants themselves, HCCC partners with a local beekeeping organization to maintain a community of rooftop honeybees that both pollinate the garden and provide educational opportunities to visitors. HCCC's Craft Garden is a member of Urban Harvest, a Houston-based network of almost 150 edible and educational gardens.

Artist residency 
The HCCC's artist-in-residence program has been active since the center's inception in 2001, providing not only studio space but educational opportunities, a stipend that covers materials and living spaces, and group exhibitions to 5-10 artists annually. The residencies are flexible, offering lengths of commitment that range from three to twelve months. Resident artists create art on-site, often utilizing both the Craft Garden and the available studios. They are required to open their studios to the public for at least two days a week, one of which must be on Saturday. Residencies conclude with artist talks and exhibitions. As of 2016, HCCC had hosted 113 artists since beginning the program in 2001.

Notable past resident artists include:

 Anila Quayyum Agha, interdisciplinary artist, 2005
 Susan Budge, ceramic sculptor, 2015
 Stephanie Robison, fiber artist, 2021
 Michael Velliquette, paper artist, 2021
 Hillerbrand+Magsamen, interdisciplinary artists, 2021

References 

Museums in Houston
Museums established in 2001
2001 establishments in Texas